Brezje pri Podplatu is a small settlement in the Municipality of Rogaška Slatina in eastern Slovenia. The area belongs to the traditional Styria region and is now included in the Savinja Statistical Region.

Name
The name of the settlement was changed from Brezje to Brezje pri Podplatu in 1953.

References

External links
Brezje pri Podplatu on Geopedia

Populated places in the Municipality of Rogaška Slatina